Duh, the Big City is the third album by Hammerhead. It was released in 1996 through Amphetamine Reptile Records.

Critical reception
The Encyclopedia of Popular Music wrote that the album "successfully distilled all of the band's most distinctive qualities—resonant feedback and sonic disharmony playing as large a part as ever in the group's musical equation."

Track listing

Personnel 
Hammerhead
Paul Erickson – bass guitar, vocals
Jeff Mooridian Jr. – drums
Paul Sanders – guitar, vocals
Production and additional personnel
Tom Hazelmyer – cover art
Tim Mac – recording

References

External links 
 

1996 albums
Amphetamine Reptile Records albums
Hammerhead (band) albums